The women's 50 metre freestyle event at the 2012 Summer Olympics took place on 3–4 August at the London Aquatics Centre in London, United Kingdom.

Netherlands' Ranomi Kromowidjojo smashed a new Olympic record to strike a fourth sprint freestyle double in history, since East German Kristin Otto did so in 1988, her fellow countrywoman Inge de Bruijn in 2000, and Germany's defending champion Britta Steffen in 2008. She blistered the field with a sterling time and a textile best in 24.05 to slice off Steffen's previous Olympic record by a hundredth of a second (0.01). Belarus' Aliaksandra Herasimenia added a second silver to her Olympic hardware in a national record of 24.28, while Kromowidjojo's teammate Marleen Veldhuis edged out the scorching Steffen (24.46) by 0.07 seconds to snatch the bronze in 24.39, handing over an entire medal haul for the Dutch squad with a one–three finish.

Great Britain's home favorite Francesca Halsall finished behind Steffen by a fingertip with a fifth-place time in 24.47. Meanwhile, Sweden's Therese Alshammar shook off a pinched nerve injury to officially compete in her fifth Olympics, but managed only to claim a sixth spot in 24.61. U.S. swimmer Jessica Hardy (24.62) and the Bahamas' Arianna Vanderpool-Wallace (24.69) rounded out the field in a splash-and-dash finale.

Notable swimmers missed the top-eight final including Aussie sisters Bronte and Cate Campbell, defending bronze medalist; and Halsall's teammate Amy Smith, who finished outside the roster by 16-hundredths of a second with a ninth-place time in 24.87. Earlier on the morning prelims, Smith picked up a sixteenth spot in a most exciting three-way swim-off against U.S. sprinter Kara Lynn Joyce and Iceland's Sarah Blake Bateman after they each posted a matching time of 25.28.

Records
Prior to this competition, the existing world and Olympic records were as follows.

The following records were established during the competition:

Results

Heats

Qualification swim-off

Semifinals

Semifinal 1

Semifinal 2

Final

References

External links
NBC Olympics Coverage

Women's 00050 metre freestyle
2012 in women's swimming
Women's events at the 2012 Summer Olympics